Kiruba is an Ecuadorian pop group originally composed of Maria Jose Blum, Diana Rueda, Mariela Nazareno, Gabriela Villalba, and Cecilia Calle that traces its origin to the 2002 Ecuadorian season of reality television show Popstars.     

The group's history can be divided into three phases: the first from 2003 to 2004, immediately after winning Popstars, then from 2008 to 2009 under the name "Hada 4" (after Gabriela Villalba left to join Chilean band Kudai), and finally 2017 to 2018 under their original name after the group's full reunion in 2017.   

On October 23, 2018, Kiruba confirmed through social networks Cecilia Calle's departure from the group, citing her desire to take care of her family.

History 
The band was originally the outcome of the first season of the ecuadorian version of the franchise TV reality show Popstars, which aired at Teleamazonas Channel in 2003. After three months of competition, a panel of judges chose the final five members: María José Blum (Guayaquil), Diana Rueda (Quito), Mariela Nazareno (Esmeraldas), Gabriela Villalba (Quito) and Cecilia Calle (Guayaquil).

The name Kiruba was chosen during the show, a Diana Rueda suggestion referencing Quiruba, a leader of the Amazonian Shuar Tribe, known for bravely fighting the Spanish Conquerors near Macas.

Launch 
The quintet released their first album entitled Kiruba just released the results of the competition, so its sales soared to 5,000 copies just a few days after its appearance in stores. Kiruba became overnight into a truly national phenomenon that was, among other prizes, triple-platinum disc. Her first single "Quisiera" hold first place for several weeks in Ecuador and in Latin America was the fifteenth in the counting chain HTV.

Their next singles "Camina", "Me Pierdo" and "Como Extraño Tu Luz" were less successful but managed to position at the top of the radio stations in Ecuador.

Second Disc and Separation 
In 2004 the group launched its second and final album as a quintet: Baila La Luna ("The Moon Dances"), promoting the first (and only single) "Me Quedo Contigo" ("I Stay With You"). The single reached the third place at the Ecuadorian charts. The band broke up that same year due to differences between the members.

After separation, Mariela Nazareno led a local rock band called Tinticos, Diana Rueda worked on several painting exhibitions, Cecilia Calle founded a dance company and developed as a television host, María José Blum took part in the soap opera El Cholito and Gabriela Villalba joined Chilean rock band Kudai in 2006.

Hada 4 
In 2008, four of the five former members of Kiruba reunited. These included Blum, Rueda, Nazareno, and Calle. The new project was named Hada 4.  

In June 2008 they announced in a press conference their return to the music scene and the first single from the new album: "Volviéndome Loca" ("Going Crazy"), was released on July 15. On the night of November 9, it made its first official appearance in the program Bailando Por Un Sueño Edición Especial (Dancing With The Stars Special Edition), but with the surprise that Diana Rueda had left the quartet then had become a trio (María José, Mariela, and Cecilia).

Return in 2017 
In 2017 Kiruba announced their return to the stage, with the 5 original members on a cover for "Hola!" magazine. Kiruba was national trending on Twitter for 4 days. On January 30, 2018, Kiruba premiered his new song "Se Me Fue", a song that has the collaboration of Magic Juan, a former member of Proyecto Uno. The musical theme mixes pop with urban and Latin. The essence of the quintet is still perceived in their music.

The song was composed by Andrés Torres, producer of the hit song "Despacito", Santiago Hernández, ex-member of Sin Ánimo de Lucro and Gabriela Villalba. Sebastián Jácome, an Ecuadorian based in Los Angeles, was in charge of the production of the song.

"Se Me Fue", reached the 2nd place in the Ecuadorian chart (25 Nacionales) in the first week of release and stayed 13 weeks in the top 10 of the list.

On June 17, 2018, Kiruba premiered on his YouTube channel and Facebook "#LaRevuelta" a miniseries where the members tell anecdotes of the past with the band as well as the advances in their current musical project. In episode number four of the miniseries released on July 8, 2018 details of the band are revealed recording a new single, which is composed by Diana Rueda and produced by Cesar Galarza.

Discography

Kiruba - 2003 
 Quisiera
 Como Extraño Tu Luz
 Me Pierdo
 Dame
 Mirando Como Un Bobo Watching Like A Fool'
 Te Llevo En Mi Corazón
 Camina
 Eres
 Con Todo Lo Que Tengo
 Mosaico Kiruba [El Aguacate, Pasional, Vasija de Barro]

Baila La Luna - 2004 
 Me Quedo Contigo
 La Cumbia Del Olvido
 Calle Desierta
 A Veces
 Trotamundos
 Vuelve A Mí
 Pensar En Ti
 Bello Ciao
 Baila La Luna
 Tarde O Temprano

Hada 4 - 2008 
 Volviéndome Loca

References

External links 
 Official Fan Website

Ecuadorian women singers
Latin American girl groups
Musical groups established in 2003
Ecuadorian musical groups